Charles Joseph Sheerin (April 17, 1909 – September 27, 1986) was a professional baseball infielder. He played one season in Major League Baseball for the Philadelphia Phillies in 1936.

Sources

Major League Baseball infielders
Philadelphia Phillies players
Atlanta Crackers players
York White Roses players
Fordham Rams baseball players
Tulsa Oilers (baseball) players
Hazleton Mountaineers players
Toronto Maple Leafs (International League) players
Baseball players from New York (state)
1909 births
1986 deaths
Burials at the Cemetery of the Holy Rood